Glauber Rodrigues da Silva (born 11 November 1983) commonly known as Glauber, is a Brazilian professional footballer.

References

1983 births
Living people
Brazilian footballers
Brazilian expatriate footballers
C.D. FAS footballers
Expatriate footballers in El Salvador
Association football midfielders
People from Barra do Piraí